(also known by its English title "The Creamy Season") is one of the two songs that made up the fourth single by Japanese entertainer Chiaki Kuriyama, along with "Ketteiteki Sanpunkan". They were released on March 2, 2011, as the lead singles from her debut album Circus, released two weeks later. Both songs were produced by musician Ringo Sheena.

Background and development 

After Chiaki Kuriyama debuted in early 2010 with the single "Ryūsei no Namida", she began to release collaboration singles, featuring a famous Japanese rock musician as the producer. "Kanōsei Girl" (2010) was produced by Tomoyasu Hotei, and "Cold Finger Girl" (2011) by Kenichi Asai of Blankey Jet City. In 2010, Kuriyama starred in the drama Atami no Sōsakan. The Ringo Sheena-lead band Tokyo Jihen performed the theme song for the drama, "Tengoku e Yōkoso".

Writing and production 

Of the two songs, "Oishii Kisetsu" was produced second, after "Ketteiteki Sanpunkan" had been created. Both songs featured Sheena's band Tokyo Jihen performing instruments. The band recorded together with Kuriyama, and Sheena gave pointers to Kuriyama during the sessions, asking her to sing the song in a louder voice. The song was written by Sheena about a regular girl who was in love, as opposed to a song written with Kuriyama in mind.

The third song on the single is a cover of Anri's "Cat's Eye", the eponymous theme song for the 1983 anime Cat's Eye.

Promotion and release 

Music videos were produced for both "Oishii Kisetsu" and "Ketteiteki Sanpunkan", both directed by Hiroshi Usui. Usui was a director who had previously worked with Sheena on videos such as "Kōfukuron" (1998), "Kabukichō no Joō" (1998), "Koko de Kiss Shite." (1999) and Tokyo Jihen's "Kabuki" and "Kenka Jōtō". (2006) The video for "Oishii Kisetsu" features Kuriyama performing the song into a standing microphone, in a room with a high ceiling with other musicians. Additional scenes feature Kuriyama performing the song while sitting at a chair in a different outfit. Kuriyama wears a Vivienne Westwood armour ring while performing the song; a ring that Sheena wore during her early career.

On March 5, Kuriyama performed an in-store live at Tower Records in Shinjuku to promote the single. Between February 28 and March 5, promotional comments by Kuriyama appeared on Sendai FM, Cross FM, FM Port, Kiss-FM Kobe, FM OSAKA and Tokyo FM's School of Lock! Interviews appeared in February and March editions of What's In?, BLT, Pichilemon, De View 50, Otona Lab, The Japan Times and Tower. She also appeared on the Fuji TV show Sakigake! Ongaku Banzuke on March 10, 2011.

During Tokyo Jihen's farewell tour held in February 2012, Bon Voyage, Tokyo Jihen performed "Oishii Kisetsu" live. Sheena performed "Oishii Kisetsu" again during her solo Tōtaikai concerts in November 2013.

Critical reception 

Kazuhiro "Scao" Ikeda of EMTG praised the song, calling it "bewitching and cute".

Track listings

Chart rankings

Sales and certifications

Release history

References 

2011 singles
2011 songs
Japanese-language songs
Chiaki Kuriyama songs
Ringo Sheena songs
Songs written by Ringo Sheena
Defstar Records singles